Cooper School, Coopers School, or similar, may refer to:

United Kingdom
 Cooper School, Bicester, Oxfordshire, England
 Coopers School, Chislehurst, London Borough of Bromley, England
 Coopers' Company and Coborn School, Upminster, London Borough of Havering, England

United States
 Cooper Union for the Advancement of Science and Art, or Cooper Institute, New York City, New York
 Cooper School (Mebane, North Carolina)
 Frank B. Cooper School, Seattle, Washington
 Neva King Cooper Educational Center, Homestead, Florida

See also
 
 Cooper High School (disambiguation)